Dementia is a cognitive disorder.

Dementia may also refer to:

 Dementia (1955 film), a low-budget horror film made in 1953 and released in 1955
 Dementia (2014 film), a 2014 Filipino horror film
 Dementia (2015 film), a 2015 film directed by Mike Testin
 Dementia (journal), an academic journal established in 2002 covering research on the disorder
Dementia, a female wrestler from the Gorgeous Ladies of Wrestling
 Dementia, one of the two kingdoms in the 2007 role-playing game The Elder Scrolls IV: Shivering Isles
 "Dementia," a song by Owl City featuring Mark Hoppus from the 2012 album The Midsummer Station
 "Dementia", a song by Erra from the 2013 album Augment
 Music played by Dr. Demento

Also
 Dimensia, a line of high-end TVs made under RCA